Mark of the Damned is a 2006 American horror film directed by Eric Miller.  Filmed in black-and-white, it is an homage to the classic El Santo movies.

The film was shown on Cinema Insomnia's 2009 Halloween special.

Plot summary

References

External links
 
 Mark of the Damned Part 1 on Livestream
 Mark of the Damned Part 2 on Livestream

2006 films
2006 horror films
American zombie films
American black-and-white films
American independent films
2000s English-language films
2000s American films